Flowers is the second compilation album by the Rolling Stones, released in the summer of 1967. The group recorded the songs at various studios dating back to 1965. Three of the songs had never been released: "My Girl", "Ride On, Baby" and "Sittin' on a Fence", the first of which was recorded in May 1965 during the sessions for "(I Can't Get No) Satisfaction," and the other two of which were recorded in December 1965 during the first lot of Aftermath sessions. The rest of the album tracks either appeared as singles or had been omitted from the American versions of Aftermath and Between the Buttons.

The title refers to the album's cover, with flower stems underneath the portrait of each of the band members. Bassist Bill Wyman claims that Mick Jagger and Keith Richards deliberately arranged the stem of Brian Jones's flower so that it had no leaves, as a prank.  The portraits are from the British version of Aftermath. Flowers reached number three in the US during the late summer of 1967 and was certified gold. In August 2002 it was remastered and reissued on CD and SACD digipak by ABKCO Records.

Critical reception 

Because of its assorted compilation, Flowers was originally disregarded by some music critics as a promotional ploy aimed at American listeners. Critic Robert Christgau, on the other hand, suggested that managers Andrew Loog Oldham and Lou Adler released the album as a "potshot at Sergeant Pepper itself, as if to say, 'Come off this bullshit, boys. You're only in it for the money." He wrote in 1970 in The Village Voice:

In a retrospective review for AllMusic, Richie Unterberger gave Flowers four-and-a-half out of five stars and said that the music it compiles is exceptional enough not to be dismissed as a marketing "rip-off": "There's some outstanding material you can't get anywhere else, and the album as a whole plays very well from end to end." Tom Moon gave it five stars in The Rolling Stone Album Guide (2004) and wrote that "it holds together as one of the Stones' best records, a concept album about the social scene that gathers around five rich young men with an appetite for sex, drugs, and gossip."

Track listing
All songs by Mick Jagger and Keith Richards, except "My Girl" by Smokey Robinson and Ronald White.

Personnel
 Mick Jaggerlead vocals, backing vocals, percussion
 Keith Richardselectric guitar, acoustic guitar, backing vocals; double bass on "Ruby Tuesday"; bass guitar on "Let's Spend the Night Together"
 Brian Joneselectric guitar, acoustic guitar, keyboards, bass guitar; koto on "Take It or Leave It" and "Ride On, Baby"; dulcimer on "Lady Jane"; recorder on "Ruby Tuesday"
 Bill Wymanbass guitar, backing vocals, organ, percussion; double bass on "Ruby Tuesday"
 Charlie Wattsdrums, percussion

Charts

Certification

References

Further reading

External links 
 

Albums produced by Andrew Loog Oldham
The Rolling Stones compilation albums
1967 compilation albums
ABKCO Records compilation albums
London Records compilation albums